Joseph Salem Lelyveld (born April 5, 1937 in Cincinnati, Ohio) is an American journalist. He was executive editor of The New York Times from 1994 to 2001, and interim executive editor in 2003 after the resignation of Howell Raines. He is a Pulitzer Prize-winning journalist and author, and a frequent contributor to the New York Review of Books.

Early life and education 
Lelyveld received B.A. and M.A. degrees from Harvard University in 1958 and 1959. He also received his M.S. degree from Columbia University in 1960.

Career

The New York Times
In all, Lelyveld worked at The New York Times for nearly 40 years, beginning in 1962. At the Times, he went from copy editor to foreign correspondent within three years.

He was also a foreign editor of The New York Times, and its managing editor.

Authorship
Among Lelyveld's books is Move Your Shadow: South Africa, Black and White, based on his reporting from Johannesburg, South Africa, in the 1960s and 1980s. He received the Pulitzer Prize for General Non-Fiction in 1986 for Move Your Shadow.

Lelyveld's book Great Soul: Mahatma Gandhi and His Struggle with India was banned in the Indian state of Gujarat from publication for allegedly insinuating that the subject, Mahatma Gandhi, was in a homosexual or homophilic relationship. This ban received a unanimous vote in favor of the state of Gujarat in April 2011 by Gujarat's state assembly.

Personal life 
Lelyveld lives in New York and has two daughters. He is of Jewish descent.

Nita Lelyveld, a daughter of Joseph Lelyveld, was named as "city editor" of the Portland Press Herald in 2021.

Works
 "House of Bondage: A South African Black Man Exposes in His Own Pictures and Words the Bitter Life of His Homeland Today" (the foreword to a book by Ernest Cole). New York: Random House, 1967. LCCN 67-21147.
 Move Your Shadow: South Africa, Black and White New York: Crown Publishing Group, 1985. .
 Omaha Blues: A Memory Loop. New York: Farrar, Straus and Giroux, 2005.  .  
 Great Soul: Mahatma Gandhi and His Struggle with India Alfred A. Knopf, 2011.  .
 His Final Battle: The Last Months of Franklin RooseveltAlfred A. Knopf, 2016.  .

References

Further reading 
"Gandhi book ban 'shameful', says author Joseph Lelyveld" Daily News and Analysis. Press Trust of India. March 31, 2011.
"Gujarat govt bans Lelyveld's book on Mahatma Gandhi" The Times of India. Press Trust of India. March 30, 2011.
"Intellectuals oppose banning controversial book on Gandhi" The Times of India. Press Trust of India. March 31, 2011.
Editors of Advocate.com (March 31, 2011). "India State Bans "Gay" Gandhi Book". The Advocate.
Joshi, Prakash; Shivadekar, Sanjeev (March 30, 2011). "State may ban book on Gandhi". The Times of India.
Mukul, Akshaya (March 30, 2011). "Too much read into Gandhi book?". The Times of India.
Prakash, Satya (March 30, 2011). "Ban may not withstand judicial scrutiny". Hindustan Times.
Roberts, Andrew (March 26, 2011). "Among the Hagiographers". The Wall Street Journal. 
Thite, Dinesh; Jadhav, Ashish (March 30, 2011). "Centre to ban book on Mahatma: Veerappa Moily". Daily News and Analysis.

External links

Column archive at The New York Review of Books
Lelyveld audio interview reporting from the 2008 Republican National Convention for The New York Review of Books
Review of Lelyveld's Gandhi biography by Christopher Hitchens, July 2011 in The Atlantic

1937 births
Living people
The Bronx High School of Science alumni
Harvard College alumni
Columbia University Graduate School of Journalism alumni
Editors of New York City newspapers
The New York Times editors
George Polk Award recipients
Pulitzer Prize for General Non-Fiction winners
20th-century American non-fiction writers
21st-century American non-fiction writers
People from Cincinnati
American people of Jewish descent
Harvard University alumni
Columbia University alumni